Charlie Danskin (29 January 1893–1968) was an English footballer who played in the Football League for Aberdare Athletic, Luton Town and Stockport County.

References

1893 births
1968 deaths
English footballers
Association football forwards
English Football League players
Ashington A.F.C. players
Sunderland A.F.C. players
Stockport County F.C. players
Aberdare Athletic F.C. players
Luton Town F.C. players